Shui Bin Village is a village in the Hang Hau area of Sai Kung District, New Territories, Hong Kong.

History
Shui Bin Village is a fishermen village established in the 1970s to improve living conditions.

References

External links
 Delineation of area of existing village Shui Bin (Hang Hau) for election of resident representative (2019 to 2022)

 

Villages in Sai Kung District, Hong Kong
Hang Hau